B/E/A/T/B/O/X is the second studio album by American electronic music duo Glass Candy, released in November 2007 by Italians Do It Better. The album received two limited-edition vinyl pressings in 2008, both including a bonus 7″ (featuring the previously unreleased tracks "High B" and "The Gate"), and one of them pressed on pink vinyl. A new blue vinyl edition was released in April 2010, including the same bonus 7".

Track listing
All songs written by Glass Candy, except where noted.

"Introduction" – 1:29
"Beatific" – 4:20
"Etheric Device" – 3:13
"Candy Castle" – 5:27
"Rolling Down the Hills" – 3:29
"Life After Sundown" – 6:18
"Computer Love" (Kraftwerk) – 7:05
"Last Nite I Met a Costume" – 3:51
"Digital Versicolor" – 5:59

Personnel
Credits for B/E/A/T/B/O/X adapted from liner notes.

 Ida No – vocals
 Johnny Jewel – drum programming, production, synthesizer

Release history

References

2007 albums
Glass Candy albums